The Heliotrope is a design of environmentally friendly housing by German architect Rolf Disch. Three such buildings exist in Germany; the first experimental version was built in 1994 as the architect's home in Freiburg im Breisgau, while the other two were used as exhibition buildings for the Hansgrohe company in Offenburg and a dentist's lab in Hilpoltstein in Bavaria.

Several different energy generation modules are used in the building including a  dual-axis solar photovoltaic tracking panel, a geothermal heat exchanger, a combined heat and power unit (CHP) and solar-thermal balcony railings to provide heat and warm water. These innovations along with the favorable insulation of the residence allows the Heliotrope to capture anywhere between four and six times its energy usage depending on the time of year. The Heliotrope is also fitted with a grey-water cleansing system and built-in natural waste composting.

At the same time that Freiburg ’s Heliotrope was built, Hansgrohe contracted Disch's architecture practice to design and build another Heliotrope to be used as a visitor’s center and showroom in Offenburg, Germany. A third one was then contracted and built in Hilpoltstein, Bavaria to be used as a technical dental laboratory. Disch's unique design accommodates different utilizations from private residences to laboratories, and nevertheless maintains the structure's positive energy balance.

 Disch also designed the Sonnenschiff office complex.

PlusEnergy
PlusEnergy is a concept coined by Rolf Disch that indicates a structure's energy efficiency. A PlusEnergy building holds a positive energy balance, generating more energy than it uses. With the completion of his private residence, the Heliotrope, in 1994, Disch had created the first PlusEnergy house in the world. The idea of a home that captures more energy than it consumes made perfect sense to him. His next goal in its development then, was the mass adoption of the concept to residential, commercial and retail space. As the concept further developed and gained financial backing, Disch built several more projects with PlusEnergy certifications. “PlusEnergy is a fundamental environmental imperative,” Disch claims. Disch believes that passive building is not enough because passive homes still emit  into the atmosphere.

Environment and energy needs
The house is designed to face the sun with its triple-pane windows (U = 0.5) during the heating months of the year and turn its highly insulated back (U = 0.12) to the sun during the warmer months when heating isn't necessary. This significantly reduces heating and cooling requirements for the building throughout the year, which are provided for by a heat pump, while hot water is provided by vacuum-tube solar panels.

Photovoltaic solar panels with a rated power of 6.6 kW on its roof provide five to six times more energy than the building uses, making the building "energy positive" (PlusEnergy). To further improve energy generation, the panels also rotate independently of the building to follow the sun, while being able to adapt its orientation in case of strong winds.

Water usage and natural waste management
In order to limit water usage, a gray water circuit (for washing dishes and clothes) is used. It also collects rainwater. Waste water is purified in a vegetated cascade pond outside the edifice.

Natural waste and excrement are dry composted in the structure as well.

Inhabitant comfort

One of the main attractions of the house, apart from its low energy needs, is its rotating view. As the building turns according to the sun's position, the view changes. This feature was later developed into a rotating hotel concept.

The roof deck includes a sun and viewing deck, as well as a garden terrace. The solar panels can be used for sun or rain protection while on the roof terrace.

All floors are accessible from the spiral staircase, reducing surface loss through hallways and corridors.

Awards
 2008 German Sustainability Award
 2007–08 Japanese PEN-Magazine Creativity Award
 2005 Wuppertal Energy and Environment Prize
 2003 Global Energy Award
 2002 European Solar Prize
 2001 Photovoltaic Architecture Prize Baden-Württemberg

Selected works

 Heliotrope, Vauban, Freiburg, 1994
 Heliotrope, Offenburg, 1994
 Heliotrope, Hilpoltstein, 1995

See also

 Sustainable architecture
 Sun Ship
 Solar Settlement
 Energy-plus-house
 Passive solar design
 Anti-nuclear movement in Germany
 Green building
 Zero-energy building
 Villa Girasole

Notes

External links
 Official website of the Heliotrop 
 Freshome.com: brief description with pictures (archived 2014)
 Article in Chinese with some pictures of the house 
  Solar Settlement and Sun Ship Video
  PlusEnergy (archived 2014)

Buildings and structures in Freiburg im Breisgau
Low-energy building
Solar architecture
Solar design
Sustainable buildings and structures
Houses in Germany